Elachista illectella is a moth of the family Elachistidae. It is found in North America, where it has been recorded from Arizona, Illinois, Indiana, Kentucky, Maine, Mississippi, Ohio, Oklahoma, Ontario, Tennessee, Texas and West Virginia. The habitat consists of deciduous forests.

Adults are sexually dimorphic. The forewings of the males are fuscous, but the base of the paler scales is grayish white. Females have darker and more evenly dark brown or black forewings than males. The hindwings are fuscous and also darker in females. Adults have been recorded on wing nearly year round.

The larvae feed on Poa (including Poa pratensis), Agrostis, Hystrix, Elymus, Oryzopsis, Bromus and Phleum species. They mine the leaves of their host plant. The mine starts as a fine line, gradually increases in breadth. The larvae are greenish yellow. Mining larvae can be found almost year-round. Pupation takes place beneath a dense white web of silk strands.

References

External links

illectella
Moths described in 1860
Moths of North America